Islamović is a surname. Notable people with the surname include:

 Alen Islamović (born 1957), Bosnian rock vocalist
 Dino Islamović (born 1994), Montenegrin footballer

Bosnian surnames